Robert Hoyt is an American sound engineer. He won an Academy Award for Best Sound for the film Jaws.

Selected filmography
 Jaws (1975)

References

External links

Year of birth missing
Possibly living people
American audio engineers
Best Sound Mixing Academy Award winners